América & en Vivo is a live extended play (EP) by Mexican singer Luis Miguel. It was released on 25 September 1992 by WEA Latina. The EP consists of three live versions of "Inolvidable", No Sé Tú", and "Contigo en la Distancia" from his performance at the National Auditorium in Mexico during his Romance Tour on June 26, 1992 as well as a new track "America, America", originally performed by Nino Bravo. "America, America" was released as a single and peaked at number 20 on the Billboard Hot Latin Songs chart. The EP was rated three out of five stars by an editor on AllMusic and received a positive review from Mario Taradell of the Miami Herald, who praised his vocals and the production of the EP. América & En Vivo peaked at number 12 on the Billboard Latin Pop Albums chart and was certified platinum in Argentina by the Argentine Chamber of Phonograms and Videograms Producers (CAPIF).

Background and content

In 1991 Miguel released his eighth studio album, Romance, a collection of classic boleros, the oldest of which originated in the 1940s. The album, which was produced by Armando Manzanero and arranged by Bebu Silvetti, was a success in Latin America and sold over seven million copies worldwide. It revived interest in the bolero genre and was the first record by a Spanish-speaking artist to be certified gold in Brazil, Taiwan, and the United States. Luis Miguel promoted the album by launching the Romance Tour in 1992. As part of the tour, Luis Miguel performed at a sold-out show on 26 June 1992 at the National Auditorium in Mexico City.

América & En Vivo features the live versions of "Inolvidable", "No Sé Tú", and "Contigo en la Distancia" from Miguel's performance at the National Auditorium. The three songs were also promotional singles for Romance. In addition, the EP features a new track "America, America" composed by José Luis Armenteros
and  Pablo Herrero. The song was originally performed by Spanish singer Nino Bravo on his album ...y volumen 5 (1973). Miguel dedicated the song to the soldiers who participated in the Gulf War.

Reception
América & En Vivo was released on 25 September 1992. The EP peaked at number 12 on the Billboard Latin Pop Albums chart. It was certified platinum in Argentina by the CAPIF for sales of 60,000 copies. "America, America" was released, peaking at number 20 on the Billboard Hot Latin Songs chart. The music video for "America, America" was filmed across several locations in the United States and Puerto Rico. The music video won the award for MTV International at the 1993 MTV Video Music Awards and received a nomination for Video of the Year at the 5th Annual Lo Nuestro Awards in the same year.

An editor for AllMusic rated the EP three stars out of five. An editor writing for Billboard magazine complimented the EP stating that it "should add another trophy to the already impressive collection amassed by this 22 year-old Mexican crooner". Mario Taradell of the Miami Herald gave the EP a positive review; he compared "America, America" to Neil Diamond's song "America" stating it is "filled with land-of-hope lyrics, heavily orchestrated production and a big, inspirational chorus". On the live tracks, he felt that Miguel is "in fine voice and a playful mood" and noted that "Inolvidable" was "more percussive and danceable than the album version" and commented that "Contigo en la Distancia" and "No Sé Tú" "showcase Miguel's romantic croon".

Track listing
The track listing is adapted from AllMusic.

Credits and personnel
The following credits are from AllMusic:

Performance credits

Technical credits

Charts

See also
1992 in Latin music

References

1992 EPs
1992 live albums
Albums produced by Humberto Gatica
Albums recorded at the Auditorio Nacional (Mexico)
Live EPs
Luis Miguel EPs
Luis Miguel live albums
Spanish-language EPs
Spanish-language live albums
Warner Music Latina EPs
Warner Music Latina live albums